Zofia Merle (born 30 March 1938) is a Polish character actress. She has made over 75 appearances in film and television. She starred in the 1978 comedy film What Will You Do When You Catch Me?.

Filmography
 1961: Komedianty as Young Actress (directed by: Maria Kaniewska)
 1962: Jadą goście, jadą as Maryna
 1964: Agnieszka 46 as Pela (directed by: Sylwester Chęciński)
 1965: Katastrofa as Zofia (directed by: Sylwester Chęciński)
 1966: The Codes as Wacka (directed by: Wojciech Jerzy Has)
 1969: Rzeczpospolita babska as Irena Molenda
 1973: The Peasants as Magda Kozlowa (directed by: Jan Rybkowski)
 1975: Nights and Days as peasant Maria Kałużna
 1978: What Will You Do When You Catch Me? as Krzakoski's domestic servant (directed by: Stanisław Bareja)
 1981: Teddy Bear as Tradeswoman (directed by: Stanisław Bareja)
 1985: Memoirs of a Sinner as Weaver's wife (directed by: Wojciech Jerzy Has)
 1988: The Tribulations of Balthazar Kober as Matron (directed by: Wojciech Jerzy Has)
 1990: Eminent Domain as Woman in Party (directed by: John Irvin)
 1991: Calls Controlled as Maria Wafel
 1993:  as Genowefa (directed by: Jan Schütte)
 2001: Cats & Dogs as Sophie (Polish dubbing)
 2002: Chopin: Desire for Love as Cook Zuzanna
 2002: Day of the Wacko as Woman with dog
 2006: We're All Christs as Woman
 2007: Ryś as Maria Wafel

Television 
 1964: Barbara and Jan (First Polish TV series)
 1976: 07 Come In 
 1983: Alternatywy 4
 1998-2013: Klan as Stefania Wróbel-Malec (permanent cast)
 1999-2003: Na dobre i na złe
 2000: Świat według Kiepskich (Episode number 42)
 2008-2009: Tylko miłość 
 2009: Niania

References

External links

1938 births
Living people
Polish film actresses
Polish stage actresses
Polish television actresses
Knights of the Order of Polonia Restituta
Recipients of the Gold Cross of Merit (Poland)
Polish cabaret performers
Actresses from Warsaw
Recipient of the Meritorious Activist of Culture badge